Small G protein signaling modulator 2 is a protein that in humans is encoded by the SGSM2 gene.

Clinical relevance
In a recent genome-wide association study, this gene has been associated with fasting glucose traits, type 2 diabetes and obesity.

References

Further reading

Human proteins